The 2015 South American Trampoline Championships were held in Bogotá, Colombia, October 29–November 2, 2015. The competition was organized by the Colombian Gymnastics Federation and approved by the International Gymnastics Federation.

Medalists

References

2015 in gymnastics
Trampoline,2015
International gymnastics competitions hosted by Colombia
2015 in Colombian sport